Neukölln is one of the twelve boroughs of Berlin. It is located in the southeastern part from the city centre towards Berlin Schönefeld Airport. It was part of the former American sector under the Four-Power occupation of the city. It features many Gründerzeit buildings and is characterized by having one of the highest percentage of immigrants in Berlin. In recent years an influx of students and creative types has led to gentrification.

History

The Berlin district of Neukölln has a long and varied history that reflects the city's changing political and cultural landscape.

Located in the south of the city, Neukölln was originally a small village on the outskirts of Berlin. Neukölln's independence ended on 1 October 1920 when it was incorporated into Berlin.

In September 1929, Goebbels led his men into Neukölln, a KPD stronghold, and the two warring parties exchanged pistol and revolver fire. From 1966 to 1975 the Gropiusstadt was built, a "Trabantenstadt" or city-within-a-city housing estate, designed by architect Walter Gropius.

After World War II, Neukölln underwent significant transformation as a result of the city's division by the Berlin Wall. The neighborhood was located in West Berlin and became a center of industry and commerce, with many factories and warehouses.
In the 1980s and 1990s, Neukölln underwent a process of gentrification, with many artists, students, and young professionals moving into the area. In recent years, Neukölln has become known for its diverse and vibrant cultural scene, with a mix of traditional and alternative businesses and a thriving arts and music scene.

Today, Neukölln is a popular destination for tourists and locals alike, with a diverse array of restaurants, cafes, and shops, as well as a number of cultural attractions and events. Despite its gentrification, Neukölln remains a working-class neighborhood with a diverse and multicultural population.

Locality subdivisions

Neukölln is subdivided into five localities:

Public transport

Neukölln is served by three operational sections of urban rail.

U-Bahn:

U7: Rathaus Spandau ↔ Rudow (running northwest–southeast)
U8: Wittenau ↔ Hermannstraße (running north–south)

Part of each of the following S-Bahn routes share an east–west-running section of Ringbahn track through Neukölln:

S41/S42: Südkreuz → Gesundbrunnen → Südkreuz (clockwise ↔ anti clockwise circular)
S45: Südkreuz ↔ Berlin Schönefeld Flughafen (only from Monday till Friday). An extension of the S45 is projected to run beyond the current terminus at Schönefeld Airport to the under construction Berlin Brandenburg Airport.
S46: Westend ↔ Königs Wusterhausen
S47: Spindlersfeld ↔ Hermannstraße

Among the numerous rail stations in Neukölln three act as interchanges:

 Hermannplatz - U7 / U8
 Hermannstraße - U8 / S-Bahn
 Berlin-Neukölln - U7 / S-bahn

Demographics
As of 2010, the borough had a population of 310,283, of whom 121,000 (38.9%) were of non-German ethnicity. The percentage is significantly higher in the locality of the same name, Neukölln. The borough is known for its large Turkish, Arab and Kurdish communities, which together make up roughly 18% of the borough's population. Recently, there has been an influx of Romani people and Sub-Saharan Africans.

Gentrification
A trend is the rapid gentrification of certain neighbourhoods within the borough. There has been an influx of students, creatives and other young professionals of mostly Western origin avoiding higher rents which are charged in other parts of Berlin. This has caused a knock-on effect, with rents rising in some parts of Neukölln. Northern Neukölln, just to the south of the Kreuzberg area, has become informally referred to as "Kreuzkölln" as the area becomes increasingly fashionable.

Politics

District council
The governing body of Neukölln is the district council (Bezirksverordnetenversammlung). It has responsibility for passing laws and electing the city government, including the mayor. The most recent district council election was held on 26 September 2021, and the results were as follows:

! colspan=2| Party
! Lead candidate
! Votes
! %
! +/-
! Seats
! +/-
|-
| bgcolor=| 
| align=left| Social Democratic Party (SPD)
| align=left| Martin Hikel
| 41,104
| 28.7
|  1.7
| 18
|  1
|-
| bgcolor=| 
| align=left| Alliance 90/The Greens (Grüne)
| align=left| Susann Worschech
| 25,238
| 17.6
|  2.7
| 11
|  2
|-
| bgcolor=| 
| align=left| Christian Democratic Union (CDU)
| align=left| Falko Liecke
| 24,191
| 16.9
|  0.6
| 10
| ±0
|-
| bgcolor=| 
| align=left| The Left (LINKE)
| align=left| Sarah Nagel
| 21,525
| 15.0
|  2.8
| 9
|  2
|-
| bgcolor=| 
| align=left| Alternative for Germany (AfD)
| align=left| Julian Potthast
| 10,125
| 7.1
|  5.7
| 4
|  4
|-
| bgcolor=| 
| align=left| Free Democratic Party (FDP)
| align=left| Roland Leppek
| 6,971
| 4.9
|  0.6
| 3
|  1
|-
| colspan=8 bgcolor=lightgrey|
|-
| bgcolor=| 
| align=left| Tierschutzpartei
| align=left| 
| 4,101
| 2.9
|  0.7
| 0
| ±0
|-
| bgcolor=| 
| align=left| Die PARTEI
| align=left| 
| 2,909
| 2.0
|  0.4
| 0
| ±0
|-
| bgcolor=| 
| align=left| dieBasis
| align=left| 
| 1,787
| 1.2
| New
| 0
| New
|-
| bgcolor=| 
| align=left| Klimaliste
| align=left| 
| 1,451
| 1.0
| New
| 0
| New
|-
| bgcolor=| 
| align=left| Volt Germany
| align=left| 
| 1,431
| 1.0
| New
| 0
| New
|-
| bgcolor=| 
| align=left| Free Voters
| align=left| 
| 1,061
| 0.7
| New
| 0
| New
|-
| 
| align=left| We are Berlin
| align=left| 
| 843
| 0.6
| New
| 0
| New
|-
| bgcolor=| 
| align=left| Ecological Democratic Party
| align=left| 
| 235
| 0.2
| New
| 0
| New
|-
| bgcolor=| 
| align=left| Liberal Conservative Reformers
| align=left| 
| 192
| 0.1
| New
| 0
| New
|-
! colspan=3| Valid votes
! 143,164
! 98.9
! 
! 
! 
|-
! colspan=3| Invalid votes
! 1,655
! 1.1
! 
! 
! 
|-
! colspan=3| Total
! 144,819
! 100.0
! 
! 55
! ±0
|-
! colspan=3| Electorate/voter turnout
! 225,767
! 64.1
!  6.5
! 
! 
|-
| colspan=8| Source: Elections Berlin
|}

District government
The district mayor (Bezirksbürgermeister) is elected by the Bezirksverordnetenversammlung, and positions in the district government (Bezirksamt) are apportioned based on party strength. Martin Hikel of the SPD was elected mayor on 21 March 2018. Since the 2021 municipal elections, the composition of the district government is as follows:

Notable people

Edgar Froese (1944–2015), musician, founder of the electronic music group Tangerine Dream
Leo Arons (1860–1919), physicist, social democrat and supporter of the trade union movement
Sebastian Blomberg (born 1972), actor
Horst Buchholz (1933–2003), actor
Heinz Buschkowsky (born 1948), politician (SPD), former district mayor of Neukölln
Christiane F. (born 1962), author of the book Wir Kinder vom Bahnhof Zoo
Ursula Goetze, anti-Nazi activist (1916–1943)
Alexander Hacke, musician, born 1965 in Neukölln
Kirsten Heisig (1961–2010), juvenile magistrate in Neukölln, created the Neuköllner Modell, applying rapid intervention procedures to deal with juvenile offenders before they embarked on a criminal lifestyle
Kurt Krömer (born 1974), presenter, actor and entertainer
Jutta Limbach (1934–2016), legal academic
Will Meisel (1897–1967), composer and publisher
Inge Meysel (1910–2004), actress
Gunnar Möller (1928–2017), actor
Mady Rahl (1915–2009), actress
Antonio Rüdiger (born 1993), footballer
Werner Seelenbinder (1904–1944), wrestler, politician (KPD) and resistance fighter
Katharina Szelinski-Singer (1918–2010), sculptor
Elsa Thiemann (1910–1981), Bauhaus educated photographer, who took many photographs of Neukölln where she lived
Lotte Ulbricht (1903–2002), wife of East German leader Walter Ulbricht
Emil Wutzky (1871–1963), trade unionist and local politician (SPD)
Engelbert Zaschka (1895–1955), inventor and helicopter pioneer

In popular culture

"Neuköln" (deliberately spelt with one 'l') is an instrumental piece by David Bowie, the ninth track on his 1977 album "Heroes".
The last track of Miss Kittin's first solo album I Com is called "Neukölln 2".
The German film Knallhart is set in the northern part of Neukölln.
The German documentary Neukölln Unlimited tells the story of three Lebanese teenagers based in Neukölln, who fight their deportation out of Germany.
Electronic music producer Kobosil is a native of the city. With a Bachelor of Arts in audio production, he has released music on the Ostgut Ton and MDT labels.
The series 4 Blocks is set in Neukölln and Kreuzberg.
The sixth leg of The Amazing Race 32 had its Pit Stop in Neukölln.

Twin towns – sister cities

Neukölln is twinned with:

 Anderlecht, Belgium (1955)
 Bat Yam, Israel (1978)
 Boulogne-Billancourt, France (1955)
 Çiğli (İzmir), Turkey (2005)
 Cologne, Germany (1967)
 Hammersmith and Fulham (London), England, United Kingdom (1955)
 Leonberg, Germany (1970)
 Marino, Italy (1980)
 Pavlovsk (Saint Petersburg), Russia (1991)
 Prague 5 (Prague), Czech Republic (2005)
 Pushkin (Saint Petersburg), Russia (1991)
 Ústí nad Orlicí, Czech Republic (1989)
 Wetzlar, Germany (1959)
 Zaanstad, Netherlands (1955)

Gallery

See also

Berlin-Neukölln (electoral district)

References

External links

 Official homepage
 WebTV from Berlin, Neukoelln

 
Districts of Berlin
Ethnic enclaves in Germany
Former boroughs of Berlin

fr:Neukölln
it:Neukölln
ru:Нойкёльн